Quivisianthe, known as valiandro, is a genus of flowering plants in the mahogany family, Meliaceae. It has only one currently accepted species, Quivisianthe papinae, native to Madagascar. Common canopy trees, they are an important food source for ring-tailed lemurs (Lemur catta) in the dry season.

References

Meliaceae
Meliaceae genera
Trees of Madagascar
Monotypic Sapindales genera